Užuperkasis is a village in , Varėna District Municipality, Alytus County, southeastern Lithuania. According to the 2001 census, the village has a population of 359 people. At the 2011 census, the population was 343.

References

Villages in Varėna District Municipality